Augasma is  a genus of moth belonging to the family Coleophoridae.

Species
Augasma aeratella (Zeller, 1839)
Augasma atraphaxidellum Kuznetzov, 1957
Augasma nidifica Meyrick, 1912
Augasma nitens Amsel, 1935

References

Coleophoridae